Dunagaha is a village in Gampaha District of Sri Lanka, with lush green surroundings. Paddy and betel cultivation had been the main source of income for many families for decades. 

Populated places in Gampaha District